The Templeton Prize is an annual award granted to a living person, in the estimation of the judges, "whose exemplary achievements advance Sir John Templeton's philanthropic vision: harnessing the power of the sciences to explore the deepest questions of the universe and humankind's place and purpose within it." It was established, funded and administered by John Templeton starting in 1972. It is now co-funded by the John Templeton Foundation, Templeton Religion Trust, and Templeton World Charity Foundation, and administered by the John Templeton Foundation.

The prize was originally awarded to people working in the field of religion (Mother Teresa was the first winner), but in the 1980s the scope broadened to include people working at the intersection of science and religion.  Until 2001, the name of the prize was "Templeton Prize for Progress in Religion", and from 2002 to 2008 it was called the "Templeton Prize for Progress Toward Research or Discoveries about Spiritual Realities".  Hindus, Christians, Jews, Buddhists and Muslims have been on the panel of judges and have been recipients of the prize.

The monetary value of the prize is adjusted so that it exceeds that of the Nobel Prizes; Templeton felt, according to The Economist, that "spirituality was ignored" in the Nobel Prizes. , it is £1.1 million. It has typically been presented by Prince Philip in a ceremony at Buckingham Palace.

The prize has been referred to as prestigious and coveted, with The Washington Post calling it the most prestigious award in religion. Atheist scientists Richard Dawkins, Harry Kroto and Jerry Coyne have criticized the prize as "blurring [religion's] well-demarcated border with science" and being awarded "to scientists who are either religious themselves or say nice things about religion", a criticism rejected by 2011 laureate Martin Rees, who pointed to his own and other laureates' atheism and that their research in fields such as psychology, evolutionary biology, and economy can hardly be classified as the "promotion of religion".

Laureates

See also
 List of religion-related awards

Notes

References

Specific

General

External links
 

Awards established in 1972
International awards
John Templeton Foundation
Religion-related awards